A time slip is a plot device in fantasy and science fiction in which  a person, or group of people, seem to travel through time by unknown means.

The idea of a time slip was used in 19th century fantasy, an early example being Washington Irving's 1819 Rip Van Winkle, where the mechanism of time travel is an extraordinarily long sleep. Time-slip stories were popularized at the end of the century by Mark Twain's 1889 historical novel A Connecticut Yankee in King Arthur's Court, which had considerable influence on later writers. 

Time slip is one of the main plot devices of time travel stories, another being a time machine. The difference is that in time slip stories, the protagonist typically has no control and no understanding of the process (which is often never explained at all) and is either left marooned in a past or future time and must make the best of it, or is eventually returned by a process as unpredictable and uncontrolled as the journey out. In realistic fiction and memoir, the research and archival processes are often built into the story, as part of the protagonist's, and reader's, journey of discovery.

The plot device is also popular in children's literature.

See also
 Time travel in fiction
 Time loop
 Accidental travel

References

External links 

Science fiction themes
Fiction about time travel